Abdelhaq Ait Laarif is a Moroccan footballer. He usually plays as midfielder. Ait Laarif played for clubs including Wydad Casablanca. He returned to Wydad in June 2009, after four seasons playing in Tunisia, Saudi Arabia, Qatar, and the United Arab Emirates.

Ait Laarif played for Wydad as the club lost the 2004 Coupe du Trône final to FAR Rabat.

References

1983 births
Living people
Footballers from Casablanca
Moroccan footballers
Wydad AC players
Raja CA players
Al-Ahli Saudi FC players
Al-Gharafa SC players
Ajman Club players
Saudi Professional League players
Qatar Stars League players
UAE Pro League players
Association football midfielders
Wydad de Fès players